San Manuel, officially the Municipality of San Manuel, is a 1st class municipality in the province of Pangasinan, Philippines. According to the 2020 census, it has a population of 54,271 people.

Etymology
The town's name originated from early settlers' founder, Don Manuel Sequig amid the town's existence in 1614, when Poblacion was in Pau (now Curibetbet) with a population of 2,023.

History

In 1688 the Convento was erected and in 1720,  both the church and convent were in place at Pau but were burned down due to a bad omen superstition, hence Asingan fused San Manuel was but natives moved Guiset, a name of San Manuel (great bamboo thickets). In 1860, San Manuel was decreed a town for the second time.

San Manuel became a town, 44 years before Asingan was, but was absorbed by the latter from 1903 to 1907. (Source:Mr. Crispo Baclit, "Ti Ababa Nga Pakasaritaan Ti Ili a San Manuel, Pangasinan")

Incident
On September 12, 2012, gun-for-hire suspect Marcelino Cardinas Jr. (alias Jun Fabro, Barangay Botobot Norte, Balaoan, La Union) was arrested on the Case Unclosed twin murders of San Manuel's Vice Mayor Bonifacio Apilado (in Urdaneta City on June 20, 2007,)and Christopher Alfonso (an engineer, on Aug. 21, 2011). Regional Trial Court Judge Joven Costales of Branch 45, Urdaneta City issued the warrant of arrest for Renato Tarinay Jr. and Cardinas, Jr. Cardinas was arrested in the house of Leonardo Sol, Sol Group leader of a Private Armed Group (PAG) in Barangay Flores, San Manuel town

In Barangay Gueset Norte, San Manuel, Pangasinan, Romero Gorospe, 40 Narra Tricycle Driver-Operators Association President and bodyguard of San Manuel mayoral bet and retired Vice Admiral Virgilio Q. Marcelo was ambushed, while Ruth Palip and Rosalinda Calip also died while crossing the street on April 19, 2010.

Geography
San Manuel, in Eastern Pangasinan has nearby neighbors: Cordillera Mountain, Tuba, Benguet, Pozorrubio, San Nicolas, Asingan, Tayug and Binalonan, all of Pangasinan, with a total land area of 183.39 sq.m.

Barangays
San Manuel is politically subdivided into 14 barangays. These barangays are headed by elected officials: Barangay Captain, Barangay Council, whose members are called Barangay Councilors. All are elected every three years.

 San Antonio-Arzadon
 Cabacaraan
 Cabaritan
 Flores
 Guiset Norte (Poblacion)
 Guiset Sur (Poblacion)
 Lapalo
 Nagsaag
 Narra
 San Bonifacio
 San Juan
 San Roque
 San Vicente
 Sto. Domingo

Climate

Demographics

Language
San Manuel natives speak mostly Ilocano. English and Filipino are spoken as well.

Religion
Every barangay has a Catholic Chapel, which are maintained by the Lay Ministers Of St. Bartholomew Parish Church- Located in the town proper of San Manuel.

St. Bartholomew Parish Church

The 1687 St. Bartholomew Parish Church (Rizal, San Manuel, 2438 Central Pangasinan) is under the jurisdiction of the Roman Catholic Archdiocese of Lingayen-Dagupan, Roman Catholic Diocese of Urdaneta.

Its Feast Day is August 24, with Parish Priest, Father Diomedes S. Laguerta, Guest Priest, Father Rafael T. Cruz and Vicar Forane, Father Elpidio F. Silva Jr.

San Manuel first existed in barrio Pao (now Bato) in 1614, while the first church was built in Pao in 1688, which was burned in 1720, due to superstition. Hence, the natives heard Mass at Sinapug, name of Asingan.

Accepted in 1860, San Manuel became a House of the Dominican Order in 1878, per Royal Decree of July 6, 1878, an independent parish from Asingan. The first “ermita” of the town was erected with the help of the faithful by Kura Paroko, Fr. Bonifacio Provanza built the first "ermita" or Bisita in 1882, with a cruciform.  Fr. Jose Ma. Puente continued the construction and on October 1, 1894, a great whirlwind destroyed the ermita which was rebuilt by Fr, Fuente adding the convent. The 1898 revolutionaries destroyed the Church. Fr. Probanza built a small convent and the old church was about 100 meter long and 20 meters wide.

Economy

Tourism
San Manuel has the following attractions and interesting points:

NGCP's San Manuel street-lighting project:  the National Grid Corporation of the Philippines (NGCP) electrified San Manuel from Nagsaag Extra-High Voltage (EHV) substation down to Asuncion Street. per Chief Administrative Officer Anthony L. Almeda and San Manuel Mayor Alain Jerico S. Perez MOA. San Manuel, Pangasinan hosts NGCP's District 3 Office, the San Manuel Substation, and the Extra High Voltage Station and transmission lines.
Fiesta yearly, March 11–13. Pista'y Dayat
Butao Springs : A&E spring resort at Butao.  Botao Spring Resort: a scenic picnic background, virtual oasis with 5 swimming pools, shady areas, spring water and 3-room cottage.  Villa Felisa Spring Resort a hidden place to enjoy peaceful and scenic view to relaxed from busy urban life.
San Roque Multi-Purpose Power Plant - San Roque Dam (Philippines) is the second largest dam in Asia.
It is Asia's tallest dam and largest private hydropower project, costing US$1.19 billion and generating 345 MW of power.

On May 11, 2012, granite "Walk of Fame" Memorial was unveiledd: Names of San Manuel Leaders, Mayors and notable residents were inscribed at the very long Marker in front of the Municipio or Town hall .
Feast of Saint Bartholomew - month of October.
Historical Marker of 1886 Municipio Municipal (Capitan Toribio Diccion: burned, 1943 WWII; in 1934, Mayor Primitivo S. Perez, Marker and Flag Pole & 1979, Mayor Laureano S. Perez)
1927 Memorial "Veteranos de la Revoucion": Kapitan Juan P. Marquez & Sarhento Cornelio Ines (1898 Fort of Bolangit)

Government
San Manuel, belonging to the sixth congressional district of the province of Pangasinan, is governed by a mayor designated as its local chief executive and by a municipal council as its legislative body in accordance with the Local Government Code. The mayor, vice mayor, and the councilors are elected directly by the people through an election which is being held every three years.

Kenneth Marco Sison Perez serves as Mayor of San Manuel, while his brother the Honorable Alain Jerico Sison Perez serves as Vice Mayor. Previously, the Honorable Salvador M. Perez, their father, served as Vice Mayor to Alain Perez when he was Mayor, after the elder Perez served as Mayor himself.

The Perez family has long held mayoralty post over four generations, including Laureano (Kenneth Marco's grandfather) from 1964–1980 and 1981–1985 and Don Primitivo (Kenneth Marco's great-grandfather) from 1934–1940 and 1956–1963. The Mayor holds office at the Session Hall which is located at the Legislative Building.

Elected officials

Education
St. Mary's Dominican School is the first and only private Catholic School in the town. It was established by the late Fr. Mendoza and handed over to the Dominican Sisters ( O.P.).

Mataas na Paaralang Juan C. Laya (MPJCL) is the largest public secondary school of the town. It was the home to thousand of students coming from different barangays of the town. It was named after the late Juan C. Laya (1911-1952), a distinguished writer and educator. Juan Cabreros Laya (Filipino novelist, publisher and awardee of a Commonwealth prize for his English novel "His Native Land") is the founder of Inang Lupa publishing and was active in textbook in the 1950s.

On 15 December 2012, For. Tom Valdez, SRPC vice president of San Roque Power Corp (SRPC), operator of the San Roque Multi-purpose Project including the Dam, opened its Education Governance Programs (with Synergeia Foundation) for San Manuel and San Nicolas in Pangasinan and Itogon in Benguet - the communities housing San Roque Dam. Main features are the day-care center and the Laklak creek retaining wall in Barangay Camangaan, repair of 5-classroom building in Barangay Bobon and building of one-classroom building each for barangays Bomboaya and Don Cristobal.

Gallery

References

External links

 San Manuel Profile at PhilAtlas.com
 Municipal Profile at the National Competitiveness Council of the Philippines
 San Manuel at the Pangasinan Government Website
 Local Governance Performance Management System
 [ Philippine Standard Geographic Code]
 Philippine Census Information

Municipalities of Pangasinan
Populated places on the Agno River